The Qatari Ministry of Awqaf and Islamic Affairs (AWQAFM) is a Qatari government agency also known as the Ministry of Endowments and Islamic Affairs and the Qatar Awqaf Authority. AWQAFM was created in April 2022 with the stated aim of "ensuring that all areas of modern life comply with the principles of Islam."  

The current Minister is Ghanem bin Shaheen bin Ghanem Al Ghanim.

Mission 
The Ministry's mission includes collecting donations, increasing awareness and practice of Islam amongst Muslims and non-Muslims, supporting Islamic clergy, and building and maintaining mosques.  "Its vision is to build a contemporary Islamic society along with fostering the Sharee'ah and cultural heritage".

Islamic Cultural Center 

Many of the Ministry's missions are carried out through the Qatar Islamic Cultural Center. The center is also known as Abdulla Bin Zaid Al Mahmoud Islamic Cultural Center (formerly known as Fanar, which translates to "lighthouse"). The name was chosen in reference to the center's missions to "act as a guiding light to mankind".

Abdulla Bin Zaid Al Mahmoud Islamic Cultural Center's Education Center offers courses in Arabic as a foreign language, Shariah Law, and Islamic arts and calligraphy. It also delivers Introduction to Islam classes in a number of different languages, including Filipino, Sri Lankan, Nepali and English.

The center also publishes the Muslim lifestyle magazine Baseera, distributes free Islamic books in multiple languages, and live-streams English-language sermons online every Friday.

Islamweb
Islamweb enables AWQAFM to broadcast web-based information with articles, Quran recitations, Q&A information, fatwas, lectures and fiqh

Investments 
The Ministry has invested heavily in the construction of the cultural center and a large number of mosques, but also holds shares in various Qatari corporations including Al Jazeera Finance, a Sharia-compliant financial institution established in 1989.

Controversy 
Former minister Mohammad Abd al-Latif al-Mana was dismissed from the cabinet in 2005 following allegations that he had been involved in the illegal trading of Qatar Natural Gas Transport Company shares. Mohammad Abd al-Latif al-Mana was also a co-founder of Retaj Marketing and Project Management in which the Ministry still owns a 20% stake.

The Ministry of Awqaf and Islamic Affairs has solicited the radical Sa'ad Ateeq al-Ateeq on several occasions. On Ramadan in 2010 the Ministry of Awqaf and Islamic Affairs invited al-Ateeq to give sermons. In May 2011 the Ministry of Awqaf and Islamic Affairs (Qatar) invited Sa'ad Ateeq al-Ateeq to give sermons. One of his sermons is listed on the media section of the website of the Ministry of Awqaf and Islamic Affairs (Qatar). In February 2014 the Ministry of Awqaf and Islamic Affairs tweeted that the Imam Muhammad ibn Abd al-Wahhab Mosque was hosting another sermon by al-Ateeq. Sa'ad Ateeq al-Ateeq has called for the destruction of Shias, Christians, Nusayris (Alawites), and Jews and called  for Muslims and Islam to be exalted in Qatar's Imam Muhammad ibn Abd al-Wahhab Mosque in January 2015. This was advertised on the website of the Ministry of Awqaf and Islamic Affairs and on the official Twitter account of the Ministry of Awqaf and Islamic Affairs.

References

External links
 Facebook page

Government ministries of Qatar
Ministries established in 1993
1993 establishments in Qatar